Kim Long may refer to the following Vietnamese places:

 Commune Kim Long, Bà Rịa–Vũng Tàu 
 Ward Kim Long, Thừa Thiên-Huế, Huế
 Commune Kim Long, Vĩnh Phúc, Tam Dương District, Vĩnh Phúc Province